West Coast Rugby League (WCRL) is the local sporting body responsible for the administration of rugby league in the West Coast region of New Zealand. The WCRL own Wingham Park and are represented by the West Coast rugby league team.

Clubs
Seven clubs currently compete in the West Coast senior competition;
Brunner Bulls
Cobden-Kohinoor Keas
Hokitika
Marist
Runanga
Suburbs
Waro-Rakau Hornets

Grand Final Winners
These are the Grand Final winners from 1979 to 2012.

History
The West Coast Rugby League was formed on 3 June, after Canterbury and West Coast played each other earlier in the day.

On the 14 June Kohinoor left the West Coast Rugby Union and two days later, on the 16th, they started the senior club competition with Blackball and Hokitika. The Grey club was added on 6 July.

The West Coast Rugby League went into recess at the end of the year, until being revived in 1919 by J.D. Wingham. Blackball, Kohinoor and Runanga competed in the 1919 competition.

Since then rugby league has traditionally been the most successful team sport in the West Coast. However, since the 1990s the West Coast has usually participated in Second Division or South Island competitions and in particular the West Coast missed out on having a team in either the Lion Red Cup or Bartercard Cup, the two main New Zealand Rugby League competitions of the 1990s and 2000s.

Notable juniors competed in the NRL
Cobden-Kohinoor
Slade Griffin (Melbourne Storm)

Marist
Brent Stuart (Western Suburbs Magpies and Canberra Raiders)

Waro-Rakau
Quentin Pongia (Canberra Raiders)

Suburbs
Griffin Neame (North Queensland Cowboys)

References

External links
 WCRL homepage

Rugby league on the West Coast, New Zealand
Rugby league governing bodies in New Zealand